Přestanov is a municipality and village in Ústí nad Labem District in the Ústí nad Labem Region of the Czech Republic. It has about 500 inhabitants.

References

Villages in Ústí nad Labem District